The Titanic has been featured in numerous films, TV movies and notable TV episodes. On television, the Titanic has been featured in genres ranging from epic dramas to short cartoon parodies.

Theatrically released cinema dramas

Documentaries

Television movies and notable episodes

See also
 Titanic in popular culture
 Cultural legacy of the Titanic

References

External links
 Titanic titles at the Internet Movie Database

In Search of Titanic (1981) at the Internet Archive

Titanic
 
Titanic
Titanic